Marysville Exempted Village Schools District is a public school district in Marysville, Ohio.

According to the district web site, it hosts “over 5000 students consisting of five elementary schools (K-4), one intermediate school (5-6), one middle school (7-8), one Early College High School (9-12), and one high school (9-12) and employs “over 300 teachers and 200 support staff.”

Operations
The Columbus Japanese Language School, a weekend school for Japanese people, holds its classes at Creekview Intermediate School and did so since September 2021. The school office is in Worthington.

Schools

Marysville High School was opened in the 1990s, with recent additions made.

The Early College High School was opened in August 2014, in this "ECHS" or "STEM" school students can choose Engineering, Integrated Technologies, and Health Science as career paths.

Mascot
The school district’s mascot is the “Monarch,” usually portrayed by a lion. Both the Middle and High Schools have wrestling, football, basketball, baseball, softball, lacrosse, track and field, volleyball, and golf teams, and marching band.  Other student activities include Art and Writing clubs, Student Councils, Swim Team, FFA, “In the Know,” Choir (and Show Choir), among many others. The wrestling team has won six league championships, and producing three state champions.

References

External links
 

School districts in Ohio
Education in Union County, Ohio